Svenskt biografiskt handlexikon is a compact Swedish dictionary of biography first published in 1873–1876 by the physician and antiquarian Herman Hofberg (1823–1883). The second, updated edition was published in 1906, under the editorship of Frithiof Heurlin, Viktor Millqvist, and Olof Rubenson. The second edition, two volumes of all together 1,445 pages, contains 4,419 articles on families and individuals, "renowned Swedish men and women from the reformation until the present times", and more than 3,000 miniature portraits.

See also
 Svenskt biografiskt lexikon

External links
Svenskt biografiskt handlexikon, digitized facsimile, at the Project Runeberg website

1873 non-fiction books
1874 non-fiction books
1875 non-fiction books
1876 non-fiction books
1906 non-fiction books
Swedish biographical dictionaries